Club Deportivo Mirandés B is a Spanish football team based in Miranda de Ebro, Province of Burgos, in the autonomous community of Castile and León. Founded in 2005, it plays in Tercera Federación – Group 8 and is the reserve team of CD Mirandés, holding home matches at Estadio Municipal de Anduva.

History
CD Mirandés initially had an affiliation with CD Miranda, but the club folded in the late 1960s. In 1988, a reserve team was founded under the name of CD Mirandés Promesas, but ceased activities twice.

A club under the name of CD Mirandés B first appeared in an official competition in 1998, but stopped playing in 2002. In 2004 the club was refounded and started playing in the La Rioja's Regional Preferente. After its first season, the club passed to play in Regional Aficionados of Castile and León.

After being always in mid-table positions (including a relegation to Primera Aficionados in 2008–09), Mirandés B finished first in the 2013–14 campaign, achieving promotion to Tercera División for the first time ever, after a draw against CD Onzonilla.

Club background
Club Deportivo Mirandés Promesas (1988–1995)
Club Deportivo Mirandés "B" (1998–present)

Season to season
CD Mirandés Promesas

CD Mirandés "B"

5 seasons in Tercera División
2 seasons in Tercera Federación

Current squad
.

From Youth Academy

Notable youth graduates
 Moussa Traoré
 Eric García
 Sergio Pérez
 Jon Vega

References

External links
Official website 
Futbolme team profile 
Unofficial website 
Arefe Regional profile 

 
Football clubs in Castile and León
Association football clubs established in 2005
Miranda de Ebro
2005 establishments in Spain